Kaala Samrajya is a 1999 Hindi language Indian film directed by Deepak Bahry, and starring Sunil Shetty, Monica Bedi and Amrish Puri.

Plot
Mob boss Kaalkeshwar Singh (Amrish Puri) has an issue with a fellow mobster who wants to expand his own sphere of influence.  During a confrontation, Albert (Deepak Shirke) attempts to shoot Kaalkeshwar, but due to the intervention of Arjun (Sunil Shetty), Albert is himself killed. Appreciative, Kaalkeshwar asks Arjun to spend some time on his estate out of town.  He learns that Arjun's girlfriend, Maria (Mahru Sheikh), had had then killed herself out of shame after having been molested by Albert. Her death has been now avenged. Kaalkeshwar introduces Ajun to his  subdued and submissive wife, Monica (Monica Bedi).  Unknown to Ajun, Kaalkeshwar is extremely jealous, and had even killed a man for simply shaking her hand and complimenting her.  His anger is unimaginable when he learned that his house guest Ajun and his wife Monica have begun an affair.

Cast 
 Sunil Shetty as Arjun
 Monica Bedi as Monica Singh
 Amrish Puri as Kaalkeshwar Singh
 Deepak Shirke as Albert
 Jaspal Bhatti as Johnny Guide	
 Tej Sapru as Kaalkeshwar's Employee
 Shiva Rindani as Kaalkeshwar's Employee
 Jack Gaud as Kaalkeshwar's Employee		
 Mushtaq Khan as Seth Mayawala
 Brijesh Tiwari as Nagpal
 Raja Duggal as Mathur 				
 Sheeba as Chandni
 Mahru Sheikh as Maria
 Arun Bakshi 
 Harish Patel 	
 Gavin Packard
 Ritu Shivpuri as Hot item number in “Aao Na”

Music
"Aaj Peene De Sharabi" - Bela Sulakhe, Bali Brahmbhatt
"Koi Hai Diwana Dil Me Kisi Ke Dil Me Hai Masti" - Arun Bakshi, Suneeta Rao
"Aao Na Aag Se Bhuja Lo" (The Sexiest Song) - Jaspinder Narula
"O My Love" - Parvez, Hema Sardesai
"Parda Hata De" - Kavita Krishnamurthy
"Tum Kaali Ho" - Abhijeet

References

External links 
 

1999 films
1990s Hindi-language films
Films scored by Anand–Milind
Films directed by Deepak Bahry